KUTF (channel 12) is a  religious television station licensed to Logan, Utah, United States, serving the Salt Lake City area as an owned-and-operated station of the Daystar Television Network. The station's transmitter is located on Cal Mountain near Tremonton, Utah.

History
The channel 12 frequency in Logan previously belonged to KUSU-TV, a non-commercial educational station owned and operated by Utah State University which broadcast from 1964 to 1970, while the call letters KUTF originally belonged to the CW affiliate in Portland/Salem, Oregon, now KRCW-TV.

KUTF was founded June 9, 2000 and launched on January 1, 2001. The station was at one point simulcast on analog low-power K45GX in Salt Lake City. There are now no longer any Federal Communications Commission (FCC) records of that repeater. Prior to June 2009, KUTF was a Spanish-language television station owned by Equity Media Holdings and affiliated with TeleFutura.

KUTF was sold at auction to Daystar on April 16, 2009, indicating a programming change is planned. On the digital transition date of June 12, the station's analog transmitter went dark. With Univision gaining full control of now former sister station KUTH-DT, TeleFutura (now UniMás) programming was later added to KUTH-DT's second digital subchannel.

After Daystar took over in 2009, the station finally completed its digital transmission facilities and resumed broadcasting on April 21, 2010 with Daystar programming. KCBU in Price, acquired in the same group deal as KUTF, never completed its digital transition and its license was canceled on July 6, 2010. As a result, Daystar programming is seen over-the-air only in the northern half of the market.

Digital television
Because it was granted an original construction permit after the FCC finalized the DTV allotment plan on April 21, 1997, the station did not receive a companion channel for a digital television station. Instead, at the end of the digital TV conversion period for full-service stations, KUTF would have been required to turn off its analog signal and turn on a digital signal (called a "flash-cut").

, this station was scheduled to go dark in 2009. According to the station's DTV status report, "On December 8, 2008, the licensee's parent corporation filed a petition for bankruptcy relief under Chapter 11 of the federal bankruptcy code... This station must obtain post-petition financing and court approval before digital facilities may be constructed. The station was originally scheduled to cease analogue broadcasting on February 17, 2009 (but actually continued to air in analogue until the new June 12 date), regardless of whether digital facilities were operational by that date. The station filed authority to remain silent as is required by the FCC."

While the DTV Delay Act extended this deadline to June 12, 2009, Equity had applied for an extension of the digital construction permit in order to retain the broadcast license after the station went dark. The maximum permitted extension is one year, requiring the station return by June 2010 to keep its license.

Subchannels

References

External links 
Official website

Television channels and stations established in 2001
2001 establishments in Utah
UTF